Langhofer Island is a small ice-covered island with a rock outcrop near the south end, lying at the north edge of the Abbot Ice Shelf, Antarctica, and  east of McNamara Island. The  lay close off the island, February 11, 1961, and geological and botanical collections were made at the outcrop. The island was named by the Advisory Committee on Antarctic Names for Joel H. Langhofer, a United States Geological Survey topographic engineer aboard the Glacier who positioned geographical features in this area.

See also 

 List of Antarctic and sub-Antarctic islands

References 

Islands of Ellsworth Land